Jonadab is a figure in the Hebrew Bible, appearing in 2 Samuel 13. He is described in verse 3 as the son of Shimeah, who was the brother of David, making Jonadab a cousin to Amnon as well as his friend. He is called "very wise" (ḥākām mĕ'ōd), usually translated as "very shrewd" (NIV) or "very crafty" (ESV).

2 Samuel 13 describes how Amnon wanted to have Tamar, despite the fact that she was his half-sister. Jonadab advised Amnon to pretend to be sick, and then ask David to send Tamar to him to make him some food. Amnon followed Jonadab's advice, and ended up raping Tamar.

Jonadab appears again at the end of the chapter, when he tells David of Absalom's grudge against Amnon. Pamela Tamarkin Reis notes that he was "privy to the confidence of both brothers", and suggests that he "told Absalom about Amnon's scheme simply because
he was a busybody, stirring his spoon in every pot."(Although Absalom did avenge his sister's defilement ironically he himself showed himself not to be very much different from Amnon; as Amnon had sought the advice of Jonadab in  order to rape Tamar, Absalom had sought the advice of Ahitophel who advised Absalom to have incestuous relations with his father's concubines in order to show all Israel how odious he was to his father [2 Samuel 16:20])

According to the Babylon Talmud: "And Thou should not associate with a sinner:....And so we find with Amnon, who associated with Jonadab, the son of Shim'ah, David's brother; and Jonadab was a very sensible man--sensible in wickedness, as it is written [Jer. Iv .22]: Wise are they to do evil." According to others, it is meant that one shall not associate with the wicked, even to study the Torah."

Keith Bodner suggests that "among the numerous minor characters in 2 Samuel 11–19, Jonadab remains among the most enigmatic, and his malignancy marks a key juncture in the story."

References

External link

10th-century BCE Hebrew people
Family of David